Dupla Identidade (literally Double Identity; English title: Merciless) is a 2014 Brazilian crime drama television series created by Glória Perez. It was produced and aired by Rede Globo. This was the first Brazilian series entirely recorded and post-produced in 4K.

Plot
Eduardo Borges (Bruno Gagliasso), or Edu, is a young man above all suspicion: handsome, smart, and sensitive. However, his perfect man appearance is simply a mask that covers up his fearsome personality: a dangerous psychopath behind a number of crimes that have caught the police's attention. A cold, conniving, and callous criminal; a serial killer who kills purely out of pleasure.
 
Edu gets romantically involved with Ray (Débora Falabella), a compassionate and daring young woman who sees in him the personification of the perfect man.  Erratic and emotionally unstable, Ray bets everything on this romance, letting herself be manipulated by her boyfriend, without suspecting his double life.
 
Unable to solve the murders, the police put together a team equipped with the most advanced forensic techniques, led by Chief Dias (Marcello Novaes) and the psychologist Vera (Luana Piovani), a specialist in criminal behavior. Both with contrasting personalities, they have already worked together in the past, and were once in a troubled relationship. This reencounter brings back old feelings, revealing that there still is a spark between them.
 
Due to a work-related matter, Edu manages to infiltrate the police. Oblivious to the fact that the killer is close by, they start an electrifying pursuit of the serial killer, who is deliberately leaving clues to challenge them. Edu becomes fascinated with playing mind games on Vera, who is determined to find out who the killer is and how he commits his crimes.

Cast and characters
 Bruno Gagliasso as Eduardo "Edu" Borges/Brian Borges
 Débora Falabella as Rayane "Ray" Gurgel
 Luana Piovani as Vera Müller
 Marcello Novaes as Delegado Alexandre Dias
 Marisa Orth as Silvia Veiga
 Aderbal Freire Filho as Senador Oto Veiga
 Mariana Nunes as Dina
 Bernardo Mendes as Junior (Oto Veiga Junior)
 Luana Tanaka as Elda
 Paulo Tiefenthaler as Nelson Pereira
 Igor Angelkorte as Ivan
 Glaucio Gomes as Assis
 Felipe Hintze as Cícero
 Thiaré Maia as Claudia
 Brenda Sabryna as Tatiana "Tati" Dias
 Maria Eduarda Miliante as Larissa Gurgel

Awards and nominations

References

External links
  
 

2010s Brazilian television series
2010s crime drama television series
2010s mystery television series
2014 Brazilian television series debuts
2014 Brazilian television series endings
Brazilian crime television series
Brazilian drama television series
Brazilian mystery television series
Brazilian thriller television series
Portuguese-language television shows
Rede Globo original programming
Telenovelas by Glória Perez
Television series about fictional serial killers
Television shows set in Brazil